Mantidactylus is a frog genus in the mantellid subfamily Mantellinae. This genus is restricted to Madagascar. The genus is divided into several subgenera that form monophyletic genetic clusters and are ecologically similar.

Taxonomy
Mantidactylus was erected by Boulenger in 1895 with the type species Rana guttulata. For a long time the genus contained a wide variety of mostly terrestrial Madagascan frogs, that were divided into species groups and/or subgenera. Several of these groups were subsequently erected to genus level: Blommersia, Boehmantis, Gephyromantis, Guibemantis, Spinomantis and Wakea.
Today, six subgenera remain within the genus Mantidactylus: 
Mantidactylus Boulenger, 1895
Hylobatrachus Laurent, 1943
Brygoomantis Dubois, 1992
Ochthomantis Glaw & Vences, 1994
Chonomantis Glaw & Vences, 1994
Maitsomantis Glaw & Vences, 2006

Species
New species of Mantidactylus are described at a rate of a few per year on average. The following list contains all described species as of 6 January 2023, arranged by subgenus: 
Mantidactylus
Mantidactylus guttulatus Boulenger, 1881
Mantidactylus grandidieri Mocquard, 1895
Mantidactylus radaka Rancilhac, Bruy, Scherz, Pereira, Preick, Straube, Lyra, Ohler, Streicher, Andreone, Crottini, Hutter, Randrianantoandro, Rakotoarison, Glaw, Hofreiter & Vences, 2020
Brygoomantis
Mantidactylus ulcerosus Boettger, 1880
Mantidactylus bellyi Mocquard, 1895
Mantidactylus noralottae Mercurio & Andreone, 2007
Mantidactylus betsileanus (Boulenger, 1882)
Mantidactylus inaudax (Peracca, 1893)
Mantidactylus tripunctatus Angel, 1930
Mantidactylus curtus (Boulenger, 1882)
Mantidactylus ambohimitombi Boulenger, 1919
Mantidactylus bourgati Guibé, 1974
Mantidactylus madecassus (Millot & Guibé, 1950)
Mantidactylus pauliani Guibé, 1974
Mantidactylus alutus (Peracca, 1893)
Mantidactylus biporus (Boulenger, 1889)
Mantidactylus tricinctus (Guibé, 1947)
Mantidactylus schulzi Vences, Hildenbrand, Warmuth, Andreone & Glaw, 2018
Mantidactylus mahery Scherz, Crottini, Hutter, Hildenbrand, Andreone, Fulgence, Köhler, Ndriantsoa, Ohler, Preick, Rakotoarison, Rancilhac, Raselimanana, Riemann, Rödel, Rosa, Streicher, Vieites, Köhler, Hofreiter, Glaw & Vences, 2022
Mantidactylus steinfartzi Scherz, Crottini, Hutter, Hildenbrand, Andreone, Fulgence, Köhler, Ndriantsoa, Ohler, Preick, Rakotoarison, Rancilhac, Raselimanana, Riemann, Rödel, Rosa, Streicher, Vieites, Köhler, Hofreiter, Glaw & Vences, 2022
Mantidactylus incognitus Scherz, Crottini, Hutter, Hildenbrand, Andreone, Fulgence, Köhler, Ndriantsoa, Ohler, Preick, Rakotoarison, Rancilhac, Raselimanana, Riemann, Rödel, Rosa, Streicher, Vieites, Köhler, Hofreiter, Glaw & Vences, 2022
Mantidactylus jonasi Scherz, Crottini, Hutter, Hildenbrand, Andreone, Fulgence, Köhler, Ndriantsoa, Ohler, Preick, Rakotoarison, Rancilhac, Raselimanana, Riemann, Rödel, Rosa, Streicher, Vieites, Köhler, Hofreiter, Glaw & Vences, 2022
Mantidactylus katae Scherz, Crottini, Hutter, Hildenbrand, Andreone, Fulgence, Köhler, Ndriantsoa, Ohler, Preick, Rakotoarison, Rancilhac, Raselimanana, Riemann, Rödel, Rosa, Streicher, Vieites, Köhler, Hofreiter, Glaw & Vences, 2022
Mantidactylus kortei Scherz, Crottini, Hutter, Hildenbrand, Andreone, Fulgence, Köhler, Ndriantsoa, Ohler, Preick, Rakotoarison, Rancilhac, Raselimanana, Riemann, Rödel, Rosa, Streicher, Vieites, Köhler, Hofreiter, Glaw & Vences, 2022
Mantidactylus riparius Scherz, Crottini, Hutter, Hildenbrand, Andreone, Fulgence, Köhler, Ndriantsoa, Ohler, Preick, Rakotoarison, Rancilhac, Raselimanana, Riemann, Rödel, Rosa, Streicher, Vieites, Köhler, Hofreiter, Glaw & Vences, 2022
Mantidactylus fergusoni Scherz, Crottini, Hutter, Hildenbrand, Andreone, Fulgence, Köhler, Ndriantsoa, Ohler, Preick, Rakotoarison, Rancilhac, Raselimanana, Riemann, Rödel, Rosa, Streicher, Vieites, Köhler, Hofreiter, Glaw & Vences, 2022
Mantidactylus georgei Scherz, Crottini, Hutter, Hildenbrand, Andreone, Fulgence, Köhler, Ndriantsoa, Ohler, Preick, Rakotoarison, Rancilhac, Raselimanana, Riemann, Rödel, Rosa, Streicher, Vieites, Köhler, Hofreiter, Glaw & Vences, 2022
Mantidactylus jahnarum Scherz, Crottini, Hutter, Hildenbrand, Andreone, Fulgence, Köhler, Ndriantsoa, Ohler, Preick, Rakotoarison, Rancilhac, Raselimanana, Riemann, Rödel, Rosa, Streicher, Vieites, Köhler, Hofreiter, Glaw & Vences, 2022
Mantidactylus marintsoai Scherz, Crottini, Hutter, Hildenbrand, Andreone, Fulgence, Köhler, Ndriantsoa, Ohler, Preick, Rakotoarison, Rancilhac, Raselimanana, Riemann, Rödel, Rosa, Streicher, Vieites, Köhler, Hofreiter, Glaw & Vences, 2022
Mantidactylus grubenmanni Scherz, Crottini, Hutter, Hildenbrand, Andreone, Fulgence, Köhler, Ndriantsoa, Ohler, Preick, Rakotoarison, Rancilhac, Raselimanana, Riemann, Rödel, Rosa, Streicher, Vieites, Köhler, Hofreiter, Glaw & Vences, 2022
Mantidactylus gudrunae Scherz, Crottini, Hutter, Hildenbrand, Andreone, Fulgence, Köhler, Ndriantsoa, Ohler, Preick, Rakotoarison, Rancilhac, Raselimanana, Riemann, Rödel, Rosa, Streicher, Vieites, Köhler, Hofreiter, Glaw & Vences, 2022
Mantidactylus augustini Scherz, Crottini, Hutter, Hildenbrand, Andreone, Fulgence, Köhler, Ndriantsoa, Ohler, Preick, Rakotoarison, Rancilhac, Raselimanana, Riemann, Rödel, Rosa, Streicher, Vieites, Köhler, Hofreiter, Glaw & Vences, 2022
Mantidactylus bletzae Scherz, Crottini, Hutter, Hildenbrand, Andreone, Fulgence, Köhler, Ndriantsoa, Ohler, Preick, Rakotoarison, Rancilhac, Raselimanana, Riemann, Rödel, Rosa, Streicher, Vieites, Köhler, Hofreiter, Glaw & Vences, 2022
Mantidactylus brevirostris Scherz, Crottini, Hutter, Hildenbrand, Andreone, Fulgence, Köhler, Ndriantsoa, Ohler, Preick, Rakotoarison, Rancilhac, Raselimanana, Riemann, Rödel, Rosa, Streicher, Vieites, Köhler, Hofreiter, Glaw & Vences, 2022
Mantidactylus eulenbergeri Scherz, Crottini, Hutter, Hildenbrand, Andreone, Fulgence, Köhler, Ndriantsoa, Ohler, Preick, Rakotoarison, Rancilhac, Raselimanana, Riemann, Rödel, Rosa, Streicher, Vieites, Köhler, Hofreiter, Glaw & Vences, 2022
Mantidactylus glosi Scherz, Crottini, Hutter, Hildenbrand, Andreone, Fulgence, Köhler, Ndriantsoa, Ohler, Preick, Rakotoarison, Rancilhac, Raselimanana, Riemann, Rödel, Rosa, Streicher, Vieites, Köhler, Hofreiter, Glaw & Vences, 2022
Mantidactylus stelliger Scherz, Crottini, Hutter, Hildenbrand, Andreone, Fulgence, Köhler, Ndriantsoa, Ohler, Preick, Rakotoarison, Rancilhac, Raselimanana, Riemann, Rödel, Rosa, Streicher, Vieites, Köhler, Hofreiter, Glaw & Vences, 2022
Mantidactylus manerana Scherz, Crottini, Hutter, Hildenbrand, Andreone, Fulgence, Köhler, Ndriantsoa, Ohler, Preick, Rakotoarison, Rancilhac, Raselimanana, Riemann, Rödel, Rosa, Streicher, Vieites, Köhler, Hofreiter, Glaw & Vences, 2022
Chonomantis
Mantidactylus albofrenatus (Müller, 1892)
Mantidactylus paidroa Bora, Ramilijoana, Raminosoa & Vences, 2011
Mantidactylus charlotteae Vences & Glaw, 2004
Mantidactylus zipperi Vences & Glaw, 2004
Mantidactylus aerumnalis (Peracca, 1893)
Mantidactylus melanopleura (Mocquard, 1901)
Mantidactylus opiparis (Peracca, 1893)
Mantidactylus brevipalmatus Ahl, 1929
Mantidactylus delormei Angel, 1938
Ochthomantis
Mantidactylus ambreensis Mocquard, 1895
Mantidactylus ambony Scherz, Rasolonjatovo, Köhler, Rancilhac, Rakotoarison, Raselimanana, Ohler, Preick, Hofreiter, Glaw & Vences, 2020
Mantidactylus femoralis (Boulenger, 1882)
Mantidactylus mocquardi Angel, 1929
Mantidactylus zolitschka Glaw & Vences, 2004
Mantidactylus majori Boulenger, 1896
Maitsomantis
Mantidactylus argenteus Methuen, 1920
Hylobatrachus
Mantidactylus cowanii (Boulenger, 1882)
Mantidactylus lugubris (Duméril, 1853)
Mantidactylus atsimo Scherz, Glaw, Hutter, Bletz, Rakotoarison, Köhler, and Vences, 2019
Mantidactylus petakorona Scherz, Glaw, Hutter, Bletz, Rakotoarison, Köhler, and Vences, 2019

References

 
Endemic frogs of Madagascar
Amphibian genera
Taxa named by George Albert Boulenger